Choi Jin-ho is a Korean name consisting of the family name Choi and the given name Jin-ho, and may also refer to:

 Choy Jin-ho (born 1948), South Korean chemist
 Choi Jin-ho (actor) (born 1968), South Korean actor
 Choi Jin-ho (footballer) (born 1989), South Korean footballer